Kaniz Ali (born 1985) is a British make-up artist.

Career
In 2009, Kaniz left London-based Bird & Bird International law firm to start her fashion career full-time. She is the international beauty editor of ASIANA Wedding International, and the founder of Books of Deen.

Publications
Ali's work has appeared on 25 magazine front covers, making up Bollywood celebrities such as Kareena Kapoor Khan, Sonam Kapoor, Amy Jackson, Urvashi Rautela, Armeena Khan, Sadia Khan, Mehreen Syed, Fouzia Aman, and Faryal Makhdoom Khan.

Her work has appeared in magazines including Asiana, Asiana Wedding International, Grazia, Asian Bride, Khush.

She is the publisher of two Surah books; Surah Book 1 & Surah 2.

Awards
 2011: “Make Up Artist of The Year”- The International Asian Fashion Awards, Park Lane, Mayfair.
 2015: “Make Up Artist of The Year”- The British Asian Wedding Awards, The Montcalm, Marble Arch London.
 2019: “Make Up Artist of The Year”- The Bangladeshi Fashion & Lifestyle Awards, Canary Wharf.
 2020: “Influencer of The Year”- The Asian Industry Beauty Awards.

Humanitarian work 
Ali has built schools in Iraq, water pumps in Bangladesh and a mosque in Ghana, and has provided aid to refugees in Syria, Palestine, Bangladesh, Lebanon.

References

External links
Kaniz Restaurant website

1985 births
Living people
British Muslims
British make-up artists
British columnists
British Asian writers
British restaurateurs
Businesspeople from London